Rune Rebne born (1961) is a Norwegian contemporary composer.

Rebne began his music studies in 1985 and graduated with a diploma from the Norwegian Academy of Music in 1997. Rebne has composed both instrumental and electro-acoustic works in addition to focusing on composing music for modern dance and theatre productions. His works have seen performances at ta number of festivals at home and abroad.

In 1995 Rebne was bestowed with the Norwegian Society of Composers’ Work of the Year Award. In recent years, Rebne has collaborated with PhD research fellow Ludvig Elblaus at KTH Royal Institute of Technology in Stockholm. The two are focusing on creating music and video projections for theatre and dance productions combined with use of sensors and software developed by Rebne and Elblaus. Rebne has also served in roles as director, instructor and composer for theatre productions Blod, Jern og Olje vol. 1 og 2.

Rebne is currently a PhD Candidate and Research Fellow at the Norwegian Academy of Music.

Production

Selected works
 Inseen (2015)
 Iit  (2012/2015)
 Aate (20092013)
 Litoom (2010)
 Hii (2009)
 Eeim (2006)
 Suiit (2006)
 Dida (2001)
 Aeo (1999)

Discography
 Eikanger-Bjørsvik Musikklag, Forsvarets Stabsmusikkorps, Frisk Pust (2008)
 Affinis Ensemble, Anatomic Notebook (2004)
 Ter Jung Sextet, Hexa (2000)
 BIT20 Ensemble, Absolute Pling-Plong Eight Ways of Making Music (1995)

References

External links
 List of Works supplied by the National Library of Norway

1961 births
21st-century classical composers
Living people
Norwegian contemporary classical composers
Norwegian male classical composers
21st-century Norwegian male musicians